Ezequiel Augusto Bonifacio (born 9 May 1994) is an Argentine professional footballer who plays as a right-back for I liga side Podbeskidzie Bielsko-Biała.

Career
Bonifacio began his Gimnasia y Esgrima career in 2014, making his senior professional debut in the Copa Argentina on 25 July during a penalty shoot-out loss to Argentinos Juniors. Just over two weeks later, Bonifacio made his league bow in a 1–1 draw at home to River Plate on 10 August. Nine more appearances followed in all competitions in 2014, including his first match in continental competition as he played the final nineteen minutes in a second stage Copa Sudamericana first leg draw with Estudiantes in September. In the following campaign, 2015, he scored his first goal in a 4–2 win over Argentinos Juniors on 16 August.

Career statistics
.

References

External links

1994 births
Living people
Sportspeople from Mar del Plata
Argentine footballers
Association football fullbacks
Argentine Primera División players
I liga players
Club de Gimnasia y Esgrima La Plata footballers
Unión de Santa Fe footballers
Club Atlético Huracán footballers
Podbeskidzie Bielsko-Biała players
Expatriate footballers in Poland
Argentine expatriate footballers